The following are the Pulitzer Prizes for 1972.

Information in this article from The Pulitzer Prizes offices.

Journalism awards

Public Service:
The New York Times, for the publication of the Pentagon Papers.
Local General or Spot News Reporting:
 Richard Cooper and John Machacek of the Rochester Times-Union, for their coverage of the Attica Prison riots.
Local Investigative Specialized Reporting:
 Timothy Leland, Gerard M. O'Neill, Stephen A. Kurkjian and Ann Desantis of The Boston Globe, for their exposure of widespread corruption in Somerville, Massachusetts.
National Reporting:
 Jack Anderson, syndicated columnist, for his reporting of American policy decision-making during the Indo-Pakistan War of 1971.
International reporting:
 Peter R. Kann of The Wall Street Journal, for his coverage of the Indo Pakistan War of 1971.
Commentary:
 Mike Royko of the Chicago Daily News, for his columns during 1971.
Criticism:
 Frank Peters Jr. of the St. Louis Post-Dispatch, for his music criticism during 1971.
Editorial Writing:
 John Strohmeyer of the Bethlehem Globe-Times, for his editorial campaign to reduce racial tensions in Bethlehem, Pennsylvania.
Editorial Cartooning:
 Jeffrey K. MacNelly of the Richmond News-Leader, for his editorial cartooning during 1971.
Spot News Photography:
 Horst Faas and Michel Laurent of Associated Press, for their picture series, Death in Dacca.
Feature Photography:
 David Hume Kennerly of United Press International, for his dramatic photographs of the Vietnam War in 1971.

Letters, Drama and Music awards
   
Fiction:
 Angle of Repose by Wallace Stegner (Random)
Drama:
 No award given.
History:
Neither Black Nor White by Carl N. Degler (Macmillan)
Biography or Autobiography:
 Eleanor and Franklin by Joseph P. Lash (Norton)
Poetry:
 Collected Poems by James Wright (Wesleyan Univ. Press)
Non-Fiction:
 Stilwell and the American Experience in China, 1911-1945 by Barbara W. Tuchman (Macmillan)
Music:
Windows by Jacob Druckman (MCA Music)  Premiered by the Chicago Symphony Orchestra on March 16, 1972, at Orchestra Hall, Chicago.

References

External links
 

Pulitzer Prizes by year
Pulitzer Prize
Pulitzer Prize